KBBU (93.9 FM) is a radio station broadcasting a Regional Mexican format. Licensed to Modesto, California, United States, the station serves the greater Modesto area.  Bustos Media used to own the station. In September 2010, Bustos transferred most of its licenses to Adelante Media Group as part of a settlement with its lenders.

Adelante Media sold KBBU and four sister stations to Lazer Licenses, LLC effective December 31, 2014, at a price of $2.9 million.

History
The station was assigned the call sign KEJC on 1995-01-13.  On 2004-09-16, the station changed its call sign to the current KBBU.

References

External links

BBU
Regional Mexican radio stations in the United States
Mass media in Stanislaus County, California
Radio stations established in 1995
BBU
1995 establishments in California